Joy Jones is an American writer and educator, a magna cum laude graduate of the University of Detroit.  She spent 12 years as a teacher, trainer, and administrator in the Washington D.C. public school system.  She has written a children's book and her articles have been published by The Washington Post.

Books written
Between Black Women: Listening With The Third Ear (African American Images)
Tambourine Moon (Simon & Schuster)
Private Lessons: A Book Of Meditations For Teachers (Andrews McMeel)
Fearless Public Speaking (Sterling Publishing)
Jayla Jumps In (Albert Whitman & Co.)

External links
Official site
Share with Joy Jones' Blogger.com profile
Washington Post: "Marriage Is for White People"

University of Detroit Mercy alumni
Living people
Year of birth missing (living people)